Sufism is considered as an essential part of Islam In Algeria. Sufism was fought and oppressed by the Salafists, and now is again regaining its importance as it was there before Algerian Civil War. Sufis have a considerable influence on both urban and rural society of Algeria. Sufism is the part of Algeria as long as 1400 years ago, so recognised as "Home of Sufi Marabouts". Most of the people in Algeria are the followers and murids of Sufism. Sufism has shaped Algerian society and politics for much of the country's history. Today, very few are aware of this legacy. Might the Sufis now provide an important contribution to the stability of the country.

Influence
Sufism is tightly bounded to the History of Algeria as it is said that the Ottoman governors of Algiers were traditionally crowned in the presence of a great Sufi Sheikh.

Before and after 1830, under the power of Emir Abdelkader, the Sufis saw their position in Algerian society consolidated and reinforced by the Algerian popular resistance against French invasion.

Many non-Sufi Muslims and Sufis united to face the Invasion of Algiers in 1830, the French conquest of Algeria and the hegemony of French Algeria.

Sufi Rituals and Practices 

 is a devotional Sufi music which is played and sung over the country according to different versions as Imzad.

Other Sufi practices includes dhikr and wird, construction of various Qubbas and Zawiyas to spread Islam.

Rahmani Sufi order is one of the most dominant Sufi order in Algeria, which is a branch of Khalwati Tariqa and it is said to be influential to the present day.

Ashura, Mawlid, Mawsim, Sebiba and Tweeza are widely celebrated by the Sufis in Algeria.

The regular Sufi practice in many of the Zawiyas in Algeria sees the presence of participants to the Hizb Rateb and the Salka without performing any other Sama or Whirling.

The anniversary of the birth and death of a Sufi Saint is observed annually in the so-called Mawsim.

Large numbers of Murids attend these ceremonies, which are festive occasions enjoyed by the Murids as well as Scholar Muslims.

Many Murids, if not most, visit the graveside Maqams, some at least occasionally, many often, and an untold number rather regularly, throughout their lives.

People regularly visit these shrines to invoke by Tawassul the acceptance of their prayers to God (Allah) Almighty, and to offer votive prayers and donations.

Involvement in politics 

Official rulers of Algeria began with Sufi blessings when taking power claiming to have had the blessing of the marabouts and dervishes who endorsed the winner politicians, and the political governance always had a relationship of mutual patronage with Sufis.

Impact of Sufism

The massive geographic presence of Islam in Algeria can be explained by the tireless activity of Sufi Khatibs and Sheikhs and Murshids.

Sunni Sufism had left a prevailing impact on Algerian religious, cultural, and social life in this central region of Maghreb and North Africa.

The mystical form of Islam was introduced by Sufi saints and scholars traveling from all over continental Africa who were instrumental and influential in the social, economic, and philosophic development of Algeria.

Besides preaching in major cities and centers of intellectual thought, Sufis reached out to poor and marginalized rural communities and preached in local dialects such as Kabyle, Shilha, Mozabite, Shawiya versus Berber, and Arabic.

Sufism emerged as a "moral and comprehensive socio-religious force" that even influenced other cultural traditions such as Berbers culture.

Their traditions of devotional practices and modest living attracted all people and their teachings of humanity, love for God and Prophet continue to be surrounded by mystical tales and folk songs today.

Sufis were firm in abstaining from religious and communal conflict and strived to be peaceful elements of civil society, and this attitude of accommodation, adaptation, piety, and charisma that continues to help Sufism remain as a pillar of mystical Islam in Algeria.

Sufi orders

Many Sufi orders were widespread in Algeria in the late 1950s, including the following:

List of Notable Algerian Sufis

Algeria is a birthplace of many Sufis such as:

 Abu Madyan (died 1198)
 Ahmad al-Buni (d. 1225)
  (died 1241)
  (died 1304)
  (died 1331)
  (died 1339)
  (died 1359)
  (died 1384)
  (died 1412)
 Sidi El Houari (died 1439)
  (died 1442)
 Sidi Boushaki (died 1453)
 Sidi Abd al-Rahman al-Tha'alibi (died 1479)
 Sidi Ahmed Zouaoui (died 1488)
 Sidi M'hamed Bou Qobrine (died 1793)
 Sidi Ahmad al-Tijani (d.1815)
 Ahmed bin Salem (d. after 1846)
 Sidi Muhammad ibn Ali al-Sanusi (d. 1859)
 Emir Abdelkader (d. 1883)
 Lalla Zaynab (d. 1904)
 Ahmad al-Alawi (d. 1934)
 Abdul Baqi Miftah (b. 1952)

Gallery

See also

References

Sufism in Algeria
[